Kirkwall East is one of the six wards used to elect members of the Orkney Islands Council. It elects three Councillors.

Councillors

Election Results

2022 Election
2022 Orkney Islands Council election

2017 Election
2017 Orkney Islands Council election

2012 Election
2012 Orkney Islands Council election

2007 Election
2007 Orkney Islands Council election

References

Wards of Orkney